Anoikis is a form of programmed cell death that occurs in anchorage-dependent cells when they detach from the surrounding extracellular matrix (ECM). Usually cells stay close to the tissue to which they belong since the communication between proximal cells as well as between cells and ECM provide essential signals for growth or survival. When cells are detached from the ECM, there is a loss of normal cell–matrix interactions, and they may undergo anoikis. However, metastatic tumor cells may escape from anoikis and invade other organs.

Etymology
The word "anoikis" was coined by Frisch and Francis in a paper published in the Journal of Cell Biology in 1994. "Anoikis", in their words, means "(…the state of being without a home) to describe the cells' apoptotic response to the absence of cell–matrix interactions". The word apparently is a neologism construction consisting of three Greek morphemes agglutinated together: ἀν- "without", οἰκ- "house", and the suffix -ις. Unfortunately, for a Greek native speaker that does not make sense, because in Greek the state of being without a home is described by the word "αστεγος", pronounced "astegos". Furthermore, "anoikis" is pronounced exactly the same way as the Greek word "ανήκεις", which means "you belong", adding to the confusion.

In metastasis
The mechanism by which invading tumor cells survive the anoikis process remains largely unknown. Recent findings suggest that the protein TrkB, best known for its role in the nervous system, might be involved together with its ligand, brain-derived neurotrophic factor (BDNF) . It seems that TrkB could make tumor cells resistant to anoikis by activating phosphatidylinositol 3-kinase (PI3K) signaling cascade .
In squamous cell carcinoma, researchers have found that anoikis resistance can be induced through hepatocyte growth factor (HGF) activating BOTH extracellular signalling-receptor kinase (ERK) and PI3K .

Using a novel high-throughput screening assay, Mawji et al. showed that anisomycin can sensitize metastatic epithelial cells to anoikis and reduce circulating tumor cell implantation in vivo. Anisomycin achieved this anti-metastatic activity in part by decreasing the abundance of the death receptor inhibiting protein FLIP. In related work, Schimmer's team showed that FLIP levels are higher in metastatic cells than non-metastatic cells, and that reducing FLIP levels using RNAi (RNA Interference) or other small molecule inhibitors of FLIP can sensitize metastatic cells to anoikis. Given that FLIP is an inhibitor of anoikis, and that reducing FLIP can sensitize metastatic cells to anoikis, Mawji et al. hypothesize that FLIP reduction may be a viable therapeutic strategy against cancer metastasis.

Cancer cells develop anoikis resistance by several mechanisms, including changes in integrin and matrix signaling, metabolic deregulation, and stress responses of cancer cells.
One key mechanism that renders cancer cells independent from tissue adherence is dysregulation of the pathway network that controls transcription factor NF-κB.

See also
Apoptosis
Metastasis
Programmed cell death

References

Further reading

Programmed cell death
Apoptosis